Eloïse's Lover is a 2009 Catalan-language Spanish film directed by Jesús Garay, produced by José Antonio Pérez Giner and written by Cristina Moncunill.

Plot 
The drama depicts a young woman, Asia, falling in love with a young artist and lesbian, Eloise, and discovering her sexuality. Scenes of Asia hospitalized and in a coma are interspersed through the film. As the story unfolds we discover their love story and the tragic accident leading up to her hospitalization.

Cast 
Diana Gómez as	Àsia
Ariadna Cabrol as Eloïse
Laura Conejero as La Mare
Bernat Saumell as Nathaniel
Carolina Montoya as Erika
Miranda Makaroff as Norah

See also 
 List of Spanish films of 2009

References

External links 

2009 films
2009 drama films
2009 LGBT-related films
Catalan films
2000s Catalan-language films
Lesbian-related films
LGBT-related drama films
Spanish drama films
Spanish LGBT-related films
2000s Spanish films